2021 United Kingdom budget may refer to:

 March 2021 United Kingdom budget
 October 2021 United Kingdom budget